Case Closed, known as  in Japan, is a Japanese detective manga series written and illustrated by Gosho Aoyama. The series is serialized in Shogakukan's Weekly Shōnen Sunday since February 2, 1994. It was adapted into an anime series produced by Yomiuri Telecasting Corporation (YTV) and TMS Entertainment where it premiered on YTV. The first episode premiered on January 8, 1996. It is currently ongoing and numbers over 1000 episodes, making it the eleventh longest running anime series. The anime spin off has over twenty animated featured films.

, who composed and arranged the music in the Case Closed animation, produced four original soundtracks for the TV anime and one original soundtrack for each of the seventeen films totaling nineteen tracks. The best of his work were compiled into three collections, Detective Conan Original Soundtrack Super Best, Detective Conan Original Soundtrack Super Best 2, and Detective Conan TV Original Soundtrack Selection Best. Two image albums were also created featuring the voice actors singing as their character.

The Best of Detective Conan and The Best of Detective Conan 2 albums collectively sold over 2.3million copies, while singles from The Best of Detective Conan 3 collectively sold over 1.5million copies. On July 25, 2017, the singer Mai Kuraki was awarded a Guinness World Record for singing the most theme songs in a single anime series, having sung 21 songs for Detective Conan, since the hit song "Secret of My Heart" (2000).

Compilation albums

Singles

Soundtracks

Image albums

Notes and references
Notes

References

External links
Theme music releases by Being Inc.

Anime soundtracks
Being Inc. artists
Discography
 
Film and television discographies
Universal Music Japan

ja:名探偵コナン (アニメ)#CD